We Cum from Brooklyn is a 1992 album by the Leningrad Cowboys.

Track listing

Singles
Three singles were released in support of this album

"Those Were the Days"

CD BMG Ariola/ 664 878 (Germany)
"Those Were the Days"
"Get On"
"Chasing the Light"

CD BMG Ariola, Chlodwig/665 308 (Germany)
"Those Were the Days" - 4:18
"Sauna" (live) - 2:08
"Kassaka" (live) - 3:59

"Thru the Wire"

CD BMG Ariola, Choldwig/74321 12064 2 (Germany)
"Thru the Wire" (Soft Version) - 3:08
"Thru the Wire" (Album Version) - 6:13
"Sally Is Something Else" - 2:39
"Fat Bob Dollop" - 3:11

"These Boots"

CD Plutonium/PLUTO  703-CD (Finland)
"These Boots" - 3:05
"Thru the Wire" - 6:46
"Sabre Dance" (instrumental) - 4:14
"Life is a Bitch (Elämässä Pitää Olla Runkkua)" - 3:59

This was also released as a promotional EP titled Vodka to promote a Leningrad Cowboys brand of vodka made by Primalco Oy
CD Plutonium/PLUTOXCD  708 (Finland)
"These Boots"
"Thru the Wire"
"Sabre Dance"
"Life is a Bitch"

External links 
 Official Website

References

Leningrad Cowboys albums
1992 albums